Geoffery Clayton Zahn (born December 19, 1945) is a former professional baseball pitcher. He pitched thirteen seasons in Major League Baseball from 1973 to 1985. In his career, he had a Win–loss record of 111–109, an earned run average of 3.74, and 705 strikeouts.

Playing career

Amateur and minors 
Zahn played for Toledo DeVilbiss High School and the University of Michigan. He was selected by the Los Angeles Dodgers in the fifth round of the January 1968 Major League Baseball draft. After signing with the Dodgers, he played in the minor leagues for six years before making his major league debut on September 2, 1973.

Major leagues 
During his major league career, Zahn pitched with the Los Angeles Dodgers and Chicago Cubs of the National League and the Minnesota Twins and California Angels of the American League. Geoff won ten or more games for six consecutive seasons (1977–82) with the Twins and Angels, totaling 81 wins over that span.

Zahn's best season came in 1982 when he compiled an 18–8 record, helping the Angels win the American League Western Division crown. Zahn was selected as the left-handed pitcher on the Sporting News AL All-Star Team after the 1982 season.

Coaching career
Zahn was the head of Michigan baseball from 1996 to 2001. He compiled a record 163–169–2 over six seasons, leading the Wolverines to a championship in the 1999 Big Ten Tournament. During the 1995 season, Zahn had served as an assistant coach at Pepperdine.

References

External links

Baseball Gauge
Retrosheet
Venezuelan Professional Baseball League

1945 births
Living people
Albuquerque Dodgers players
Albuquerque Dukes players
Arizona Instructional League Dodgers players
Baseball players from Baltimore
California Angels players
Chicago Cubs players
Daytona Beach Dodgers players
El Paso Dodgers players
Leones del Caracas players
American expatriate baseball players in Venezuela
Los Angeles Dodgers players
Major League Baseball pitchers
Michigan Wolverines baseball coaches
Michigan Wolverines baseball players
Minnesota Twins players
Spokane Indians players
Wichita Aeros players